The 2017 season is Geylang International's 22nd consecutive season in the top flight of Singapore football and in the S.League. Along with the S.League, the club will also compete in the Prime League, the Singapore Cup and the Singapore League Cup.

Squad

Sleague

Prime League

Coaching staff

Transfers

Pre-season transfers
Source

In

Out

Mid-season transfers

Out

Trial

Friendlies

Pre-season friendlies

In-season friendlies

Match cancelled after 1st half due to lightning warning signal

Team statistics

Appearances and goals

Numbers in parentheses denote appearances as substitute.

Competitions

Overview

S.League

Singapore Cup

Singapore TNP League Cup

Knock out Stage

References

Geylang International FC seasons
Singaporean football clubs 2017 season